Parliamentary elections were held in Rwanda between 16 and 18 September 2013. The result was a victory for the Rwandan Patriotic Front, which maintained its absolute majority in the Chamber of Deputies, winning 41 of the 80 seats.

Electoral system
Of the 80 seats in the Chamber of Deputies, 53 were directly elected by closed list proportional representation with an electoral threshold of 5%. A further 27 seats were indirectly elected by local and national councils, including 24 reserved for women, two for representatives of youth and one for representatives of handicapped.

Conduct
In the weekend preceding the election, on 13 and 14 September, two grenades exploded in a Kigali market. The Rwandan government blamed the Democratic Forces for the Liberation of Rwanda (FDLR), the remnants of the force responsible for the 1994 Genocide. Questions were asked about the credibility of the election as transparent, free and fair.

Voting was otherwise reported as orderly.

Results

References

Elections in Rwanda
Rwanda
Parliamentary
Parliament of Rwanda
Election and referendum articles with incomplete results